As of 1996, there were 1,496 people with varying degree of disability in Seychelles.

History
In 1981, there were 2,908 people with disability after the country made a survey to identify the number of people with such characters. And in 1991, there were 732 people.

Classification
Disability in Seychelles is classified into several categories, which are physical, mental or intellectual impairments and sensory impairments category, which include hearing, speech and vision.

Advocacy 
The Association for People with Hearing Impairment (APHI) was founded in 2005 to train teachers of the deaf and to promote public awareness of Seychelles Sign Language.

References